Harley Moore (born 24 February 1995) is an Australian representative sweep-oar rower. He was a 2017 U23 World Champion and has represented at senior World Championships.

Club and state rowing
Moore attended St Joseph's College, Nudgee where he took up rowing. His senior club rowing has been from the Commercial Rowing Club in Brisbane. 

Moore first made state selection for Queensland in the 2022 men's senior eight which contested the King's Cup at the Interstate Regatta within the Australian Rowing Championships.

International representative rowing
Moore debuted for Australia at the 2013 Junior World Championships in Trakai, racing a coxless pair which finished in thirteenth place. He next rowed in Australian colours at the  2017 World Rowing U23 Championships in a coxless four which won the U23 World Championship title in that boat class.

In March 2022 Moore was selected in the Australian senior training team to prepare for the 2022 international season and the 2022 World Rowing Championships.  He rowed Australia's coxless pair with Alex Hill at World Rowing Cup III July 2022 to a silver medal.  At the 2022 World Rowing Championships at Racize, he raced in the Australian coxless pair with Hill. They finished fifth overall.

References

External links
Moore at World Rowing

1995 births
Living people
Australian male rowers
People educated at St Joseph's College, Nudgee